Afenmai (Afemai), or Yekhee, is an Edoid language spoken in Edo State, Nigeria by Afenmai people. Not all speakers recognize the name "Yekhee"; some use the district name Etsako.

Previously the name used by British colonial administration was Kukuruku, supposedly after a battle cry "ku-ku-ruku", now considered derogatory.

Afenmai is unusual in reportedly having a voiceless tapped fricative as the "tense" equivalent of the "lax" voiced tap  (compare  'hat' and  'louse'), though is other descriptions it is described simply as a fricative and analyzed as the "lax" equivalent of the "tense" voiceless stop .

Etsako, a dialect of Edo itself, has its own dialects which are broadly divided into the "Iyekhe" and "Agbelọ" dialects, with the Iyekhe dialect being the more widely spoken.

Phonology

Afenmai has a complex system of morphotonemic alterations based on two phonemic tones, high and low. At the surface level there are five distinctive tones: high, low, falling, rising and mid. Mid tone is the result of downstep of a high tone after a low tone. The contour tones (falling and rising) either occur on long vowels or diphthongs, from a sequence of high+low or low+high, or on short vowels produced from the contraction of such a long vowel or diphthong. Rising tones are rather uncommon, as they tend to be replaced by high, low or mid.

Consonants of the Ekpheli dialect are:

The consonants marked long have been analyzed in various ways, including 'tense' or 'fortis' and paired up with 'lax' or 'lenis' partners, though there is no phonological basis for grouping the supposed 'long' consonants together, or for partnering them with particular 'short' consonants.

The postalveolar consonants are allophones of the alveolars before  plus another vowel, where  would otherwise become , as in  'to be small'. It addition,  optionally becomes  before a single , as in  'pig'. The other alveolar consonants do not have this variation, unless the triggering environment is provided within a prosodic word:  'crab' ( in citation form) >  'the king's crab'.

Orthography
A B C CH D E Ẹ F G GB GH GW I J K KH KP KPH KW L M MH N NW NY O Ọ P R S SH T TH TS U V VH W Y Z.

Phrases
Etsako phrases include:

Common Etsako phrases showing dialectical variations between Iyekhe and Agbelo:

References

External links
Etsako Language Research And Development Centre (ELRDC)

Edoid languages
Languages of Nigeria